The twin villages of Ballineen and Enniskeane in County Cork in Ireland are  southwest of Cork City, on the R586 road. Ballineen and Enniskean lie on the River Bandon between Bandon and Dunmanway and the fertile Bandon valley.

History
Ballineen belonged first to the Earls of Cork and later to the Earls of Bandon. Francis Bernard, 3rd Earl of Bandon improved the village in the mid-19th century by building a market house, courthouse, Weslyan Chapel, Gothic church and two schools in the area. Ballineen held monthly fairs until the mid-1960s.

Enniskean takes its name from Cian Maol Muadh (later O'Mahony) a local chieftain and has a connection with Brian Boru, the High King of Ireland. Cian married Sábh Brian's daughter and resided at Castlelands, Enniskean.

Located about a half-mile apart, each village was served by separate train stations on the Cork, Bandon and South Coast Railway, which opened in 1866. These two separate train stations were closed and replaced with a combined station, Ballineen and Enniskean railway station, which opened in May 1891. A number of businesses, including a flax mill, were built close to the station, on the road between the two villages, ultimately "joining" the two. Ballineen and Enniskean station closed in April 1961.

Ballineen and Enniskean are combined for planning and census purposes, with a population of 692 people as of the 2016 census.

Economy
The Grainger Group sawmill is one of the largest in Ireland, and the large Carbery cheese plant at Ballineen produces one quarter of all Irish-made cheese, including the Dubliner Cheese brand.

Amenities
The villages have a Gaelic Athletic Association club called St Mary's GAA club. There is also a camogie club called Enniskean Camogie Club. The local association football (soccer) club is Riverside Athletic.

People
 Joe Walsh (1943–2014), politician and TD for Cork South-West.

See also
 List of towns and villages in Ireland.
 List of towns in Ireland/2002 Census Records
 Connagh

References

External links
 Website about Ballineen and Enniskean
 St Mary's National School Website
 Kinneigh Union of Parishes

Towns and villages in County Cork